The Best Place to Be is a 1979 American TV film produced by Ross Hunter. It marked Donna Reed's return to acting after 13 years.

Hunter planned a sequel but this did not eventuate.

Plot
A widowed mother has an affair with a younger man.

Cast
Donna Reed as Sheila Callahan
Efrem Zimbalist Jr. as Bill Reardan 
Mildred Dunnock as Rose Price
Betty White as Sally Cantrell
John Phillip Law as Dr. Gary Mancini
Stephanie Zimbalist as Maryanne Callahan
Michael J Shannon as Patrick Callahan
Gregory Harrison as Rick Jawlosky
Timothy Hutton as Tommy Callahan
Lloyd Bochner as Bob Stockwood
Madlyn Rhue as Emily Stockwood
Rick Jason as Paul Bellinger
Alice Backes as Kitty Rawlings

Production
Reed said of her character, "In a way, she is a child-woman. She must learn to grow up and earn her own way. It's a long, hard battle. The children get into trouble. She takes on the wrong lover, a younger man. It's really about a woman who grows up enough to know the difference between a really good, old-fashioned man and a rogue and a playboy. She learns the lesson and finally meets a man who is right for her."

Reception
One review called it "a two part corpse".

References

External links

The Best Place to Be at TCMDB

1979 television films
1979 films
NBC network original films
Films directed by David Miller
Films scored by Henry Mancini
American drama films
1970s American films